Rubén García Rey (born 16 January 1986) is a Spanish professional footballer who plays as a right back.

Club career
Born in Málaga, Andalusia, García only played lower league football in his country. From 2007 to 2010 he competed in Segunda División B in representation of Real Valladolid B and Lucena CF, making no league appearances for the latter club in the last season.

In the summer of 2012, after playing one year with CD Alhaurino in Tercera División and another with Juventud de Torremolinos CF in the regional championships, García signed for Scottish First Division side Cowdenbeath after his agent sent YouTube videos to manager Colin Cameron, and the player impressed in a subsequent trial. Released after only a few months, he returned to Spanish amateur football.

References

External links

1986 births
Living people
Footballers from Málaga
Spanish footballers
Association football defenders
Segunda División B players
Tercera División players
Divisiones Regionales de Fútbol players
UD Fuengirola Los Boliches players
Real Valladolid Promesas players
Lucena CF players
Scottish Football League players
Cowdenbeath F.C. players
Spain youth international footballers
Spanish expatriate footballers
Expatriate footballers in Scotland
Spanish expatriate sportspeople in Scotland